Vahlkampfia is a genus of amoeboids in Heterolobosea.

References

Further reading
Brown, Susan; De Jonckheere, Johan F. (Feb. 25, 1999). "A reevaluation of the amoeba genus Vahlkampfia based on SSUrDNA sequences". European Journal of Protistology 35 (1):49-54.doi:10.1016/S0932-4739(99)80021-2

Percolozoa
Excavata genera